Jan Woodley is a Scottish international indoor and lawn bowler.

Jan won the Women's singles at the 1994 World Indoor Bowls Championship defeating Mary Price in the final.

References

Living people
Scottish female bowls players
Year of birth missing (living people)
Indoor Bowls World Champions